The Austrian Speleological Association (Verband Österreichischer Höhlenforscher, VÖH) is a national caving organization was founded as an umbrella organization of 26 Austrian caving clubs in 1949.

Activities
The Association coordinates the activities of 26 speleological associations; 25 in Austria and one in Germany. Membership in these associations automatically grants membership in the umbrella organization. Individual memberships are not accepted. The Association maintains:
 a website featuring the 32 show caves found throughout the country. 
 a list of Austria's longest and deepest caves.
 a library of 2,800 books and other material (in the Karst and Speleology Working Group Library, Natural History Museum in Vienna).

Awards
 The Golden Cave Bear is "a badge of honor for special services to Austrian caving." It was first awarded in 2014.
 The Poldi Fuhrich Award, named in honor of the Austrian woman who was a caving and karst pioneer Leopoldine Fuhrich (1898-1926), is presented to young speleologists for "outstanding work in the field of caving, cave documentation and public relations." It was first awarded in 2010.

Publications
 Caves and Karst in Austria (Book)
 The Cave - Journal of Karst and Speleology (magazine produced jointly with the Association of German Cave and Karst Researchers)
 Association newsletters
 SPELDOK series
 Karst-spreading and Karst-hazard maps

Collaborations
The Association works with
 the Karst and Speleology Working Group of the National History Museum to manage SPELDOK, a database containing data on over 15,500 caves.
 international karst and speleological organizations on research projects.

Associations 
The Association is a member of these international organizations:
 International Union of Speleology (UIS)
 European Speleological Federation (FSE)
 Environmental Umbrella Organization (formerly UWD)
 Association of Austrian Academic Societies (VWGÖ)
 Association of Alpine Associations of Austria (VAVÖ)*, which includes the Austrian Alpine Club, Friends of Nature Austria, Austrian Tourist Club, and the Austrian Mountaineering Association.

Notable members
Alfred Koppenwallner (1921–2016), jeweler, discovered the Cave of Tantalus (Tantalhöhle) mountaineer, pilot, motorcyclist who participated in the Oldtimer Grand Prix (Salzburgring) and skier in the Österreichische Alpenfahrt.
Sabine Zimmerebner (1970-2015) Quoted in the July 3, 2018 New York Times article, Ms. Zimmerebner was one of 728 rescuers who collaborated to free an injured spelunker in the history-making 2014 Riesending cave rescue.

References

 Caving organizations
Clubs and societies in Austria
Organisations based in Vienna